John Wehrle may refer to:

 John Baptist Vincent de Paul Wehrle (1855–1941), Swiss-born bishop
 John O. Wehrle (born 1941), American artist